John Frederick McCarthy is a musician, author, educator and creator of the Rock House Method system of learning. Since 2001, The Rock House Method has sold more than three million instructional programs of which McCarthy writes, composes, and demonstrates in. In the past McCarthy has written columns for Guitar School magazine and in June 2009 began writing a monthly column titled "Metal Rising" in Guitar Player magazine. As owner of the Rock House School of Music since 1981, McCarthy has developed a curriculum for learning to play music that covers guitar, piano, ukulele, drums, bass guitar, singing, children's early music development and music theory. His awards and accolades include CTNOW "Best Place to Learn Music" award 2015, 2016, 2017, 2018, 2019, Music & Sound Retailer award for "Best Tools for Schools", Music Merchandise Review "Best Instructional Product of the Year" 2009, 2010, 2011, 2012.

Educator 

John McCarthy began providing music lessons at the age of 15 and created the first complete rock guitar instruction series on video in 1986.  In 2000, John designed the Rock House Method accelerated learning system that combined instruction in video and book form with an on-line support system. In 2001 John began the mission to take "The Rock House Method" to masses.

John currently has authored over 60 instructional method books, 58 instructional DVDs and 1 instructional DVD rom. John designed and developed a Disney Learn Guitar method featuring the songs of Hannah Montana and High School Musical released in 2009 on DVD-ROM.  In addition to his own instructional books and programs John has worked with many of the greatest musicians in the world creating personal instruction programs featuring the Rock House Method, Alexi Laiho, Alex Skolnick, Kiko Loureiro, Jeff Loomis, Bernie Worrell, Oli Herbert, Michael Paget, Rusty Cooley, Dan Jacobs, Rob Arnold, Doug Wimbish, Leo Nocentelli and Dave Ellefson are some of the collaborating artists.

John owns and has been running the Rock House School of Music currently with two locations, West Haven and Wallingford CT. Rock House School of Music is a full service music school offering instruction for guitar, bass, piano, drums, singing and ukulele. In March 2019 the school won the CTNOW award for "Best Place to Take Music Lessons in CT" they also won previously in 2015, 2016, 2017 and 2018. The school also won first place for the Readers' Choice Award's "Best Music Instruction" in 2020 and 2021.

Musician 

John began playing guitar at the age of 6 inspired by listening to the vast album collection of his older brother and sisters and states this as the reason he has a wide range of music genres in his vocabulary. When John turned 8 he already had a band playing local camps and parties and at 15 was playing across the tri-state area in clubs. At 15 John opened his first music school called Rock House School of Music. He stayed motivated to further his music studies learning to play Piano, drums, bass guitar, ukulele and sing.

In 2006 John recorded his first solo release "Drive" a full length guitar centered instrumental album. Doug Wimbish of Living Colour fame produced and played bass on the album. Other players on the album include Will Calhoun (Living Colour) on drums, Bernie Worrell (P-Funk and Talking Heads) on keyboards, Leo Nocentelli (The Meters) on guitar, and Jordan Gengreco on keyboards.

KeyTab Patent 
In 2020 John McCarthy was awarded a patent for his revolutionary new way to read piano music called KeyTab.

Every once in a while, a new invention emerges that changes the way people learn. For guitar, bass guitar and all stringed instruments it was “Tablature.” Tablature didn’t eliminate the need for standard music notation reading but it enhanced the learning process helping players learn quickly and more effective. In the same fashion as tablature John McCathy created “KeyTab” to help piano players learn chords, progressions and complete songs quickly while getting the feel for the instrument in a positive manner.

McCarthy was awarded a US Patent in March of 2020 for this unique way to learn piano. The KeyTab system comes with a “KeyTab Note Strip”, on this strip every note is labeled and each octave is color coded. The note strip fits perfectly behind the keys on any piano or electronic keyboard. You simply line up the black keys and you are ready to rock. 

KeyTab is a great way for a casual piano player to learn to play songs quickly. McCarthy explains: “There are so many people that have a piano in their home but never learn to play it. With KeyTab you can learn songs quickly and easily. Many people want to play piano but don’t want to be a classical player or take years to go through piano methods. KeyTab is a perfect solution to help people wipe the dust off the piano keys and start learning songs.” 

Rock House Method plan to have the first Piano KeyTab Songbook ready to release by January 2022. This book will include 30 popular hit songs and the KeyTab Note Strip. People will also be able to access full videos that walk players through each song.

Future 
John McCarthy continues to write instructional books for his Rock House Method brand. The Rock House School of Music is expanding and adding locations and John McCarthy plans to franchise his award-winning schools around the world. John McCarthy launched an interactive online learning platform called Rock House U. RockHouseU.com is an interactive learning platform that contains video, audio, text and graphic images along with interactive learning tools to make a complete learning system geared for the future.

Body of work

Instructional books 

 The Rock House Method Learn Guitar Level 1
 The Rock House Method Learn Guitar Level 2
 The Rock House Method Learn Guitar Level 3
The Rock House Method Reading Music for Guitar
 The Rock House Method Learn Piano Level 1
 The Rock House Method Learn Piano Level 2
 The Rock House Method Learn Piano Level 3
 The Rock House Method Learn Bass Level 1
 The Rock House Method Learn Bass Level 2
 The Rock House Method Learn Bass Master Edition
 The Rock House Method Learn Guitar Mater Edition
 The Rock House Method Learn Piano Mater Edition
 The Rock House Method Learn Ukulele a Complete Course
 The Rock House Method Master Rock Guitar a Complete Course
 The Rock House Method Master Blues Guitar a Complete Course
 The Rock House Method Lead Singer From Start to Stage
 The Rock House Method Littler Rockers - Your Childs First Musical Steps
 The Rock House Method Modes Demystified
 The Rock House Method Guitar for Kids
 The Rock House Method Piano for Kids
Rock House Learn Rock Guitar Beginner
Rock House Learn Rock Guitar Intermediate
Rock House Learn Rock Guitar Advanced
Rock House Learn Rock Guitar Course
Rock House Learn Rock Acoustic Beginner
Rock House Learn Rock Acoustic Intermediate
Rock House Children's Guitar Method
Rock House Clap, Tap, Sing & Swing
Rock House The Only Chord Book You'll Ever Need – Guitar
Rock House The Only Chord Book You'll Ever Need – Keyboard
So Easy Ultimate Guitar Acoustic Guitar Course
So Easy Ultimate Guitar Electric Guitar Course
House of Blues Acoustic Guitar Beginner
House of Blues Electric Guitar Beginner
House of Blues Acoustic Guitar Course
House of Blues Electric Guitar Course
House of Blues Blues Guitar Course
House of Blues Blues Guitar Level 1
House of Blues Blues Guitar Level 2
House of Blues Guitar Master Edition

Instructional videos / DVD 

Rock House Learn Rock Guitar Beginner
Rock House Learn Rock Guitar Intermediate
Rock House Learn Rock Guitar Advanced
Rock House Learn Rock Guitar Course
Rock House Learn Rock Acoustic Beginner
Rock House Learn Rock Acoustic Intermediate
Rock House Blues Riffs, Rhythms & Secrets
Rock House Hands of Steel
Rock House Advanced Metal
Rock House Modes Demystified
Rock House Learn Metal Guitar Beginner
Rock House Learn Metal Guitar Intermediate
Rock House Learn Metal Guitar Advanced
Rock House Learn Blues Guitar Beginner
Rock House Learn Blues Guitar Intermediate
Rock House Learn Blues Guitar Advanced
Rock House Lead Guitar
Rock House Learn to Play Ukulele
Rock House Modern Classical Guitar
So Easy Electric Guitar Level 1
So Easy Electric Guitar Level 2
So Easy Acoustic Guitar Level 1
So Easy Acoustic Guitar Level 2
House of Blues Acoustic Guitar Beginner
House of Blues Electric Guitar Beginner
House of Blues Blues Guitar Level 1
House of Blues Learn Metal Guitar Beginner
House of Blues Blues Guitar Level 2
Peavey Play It All Acoustic Guitar
Peavey Play It All Electric Guitar

CD/DVD ROM interactive programs 

Disney Learn Guitar Method – featuring the songs of Hannah Montana & High School Musical

Branded instructional videos / DVD (featured in guitar packs) 

Washburn/Lyon Acoustic and Electric Guitar
Peavey Acoustic Guitar
Peavey Electric Guitar
Silvertone Acoustic Guitar
Silvertone Electric Guitar
Burswood Acoustic and Electric Guitar
SX Acoustic Guitar
SX Electric Guitar
Valencia Classical Guitar
Gypsy Rose Acoustic, Electric and Bass Guitar
Mahalo Ukulele
Ashton Acoustic and Electric Guitar
Spectrum Acoustic Guitar
Spectrum Electric Guitar
Spectrum Keyboard
Behringer Acoustic and Electric Guitar
Jim Deacan Acoustic and Electric Guitar
Switch Acoustic and Electric Guitar

Custom Artist Programs 

Leo Nocentelli (The Meters)
Doug Wimbish (Living Colour)
Rob Arnold (Chimaira)
Marc Rizzo (Soul Fly, Solo Artist)
Dan Jacobs (Atreyu)
Alexi Laiho (Children of Bodom)
David Ellefson (Megadeth)
Bernie Worrell (P-Funk, Talking Heads)
Oli Herbert (All That Remains)
Michael "Padge" Paget (Bullet for My Valentine)
Bobby Thomson (Job for a Cowboy)
Kiko Loureiro (Solo Artist, Angra)
Alex Skolnick (Testament, Alex Skolnick Trio, Trans Siberian Orchestra)
Gary Hoey (Solo Artist)
Jeff Loomis (Nevermore, Solo Artist)
Buz McGrath (Unearth)
Rusty Cooley (Solo Artist)
Freekbass Rock House Funk Bass (Solo artist)
Alex Bach – Guitar for Girls (Solo Artist)

John McCarthy CD releases 

13 O’clock – independent release (1999)
Drive – solo instrumental guitar (2006)

References 

Living people
Year of birth missing (living people)
American rock guitarists
American male guitarists